Shalonn "Kiki" Curls (born December 7, 1968) is an American politician who served as a member of the Missouri Senate. She represented the 9th district, which includes part of Jackson County, from 2011 to 2020.

Early life and education
Kiki Curls was born in Los Angeles in 1968. She attended St. Teresa's Academy and graduated from the University of Missouri.

Career
She currently works as a real estate developer.

Politics
In 2006, Kiki Curls ran for the 41st district of the Missouri House of Representatives. She won election unopposed and won reelection unopposed in 2008 and 2010. In 2011 State Senator Yvonne S. Wilson retired from the senate so Governor Jay Nixon made a special election to fill her seat. Curls ran for the seat with the support of Wilson. Her opponent was Republican Nola Wood. She won the election with 83 percent of the vote. She is also the 14th ward's Democratic Committeewoman in Kansas City.

Committee assignments
Appropriations
General Laws
Health, Mental Health, Seniors & Families
Joint Committee on Capital Improvements & Leases Oversight
Joint Committee on Corrections
Joint Committee on Tax Policy

Electoral history

Personal life
Curls attends St. Monica's Catholic Church and is the mother of twins.

References

External links 
 Official Missouri Senate profile
 Interest Group Ratings
 Campaign Finance Information
 Lobbyist Gifts

Women state legislators in Missouri
Democratic Party Missouri state senators
Democratic Party members of the Missouri House of Representatives
Living people
University of Missouri alumni
1968 births
Politicians from Los Angeles
Politicians from Kansas City, Missouri
21st-century American politicians
21st-century American women politicians